Pokr Gilanlar (also, Pokr-Gilaylar, and Malaya Gilanlar) is a hamlet in the Ararat Province of Armenia.

See also
 Ararat Province
 Gilanlar

References 

Populated places in Ararat Province